Wei Ling Gallery is an art gallery located in Kuala Lumpur, Malaysia in the Brickfields area. The gallery was founded by Lim Wei-Ling in 2002 to actively encourage the works of Malaysian contemporary artists and Malaysian culture. The gallery's collection offers an overview of modern and contemporary art, including works of architecture and design, drawing, painting, sculpture, photography,  prints, electronic media and artist's books.

The gallery is also the largest publisher of artist's books in Malaysia, with over 100 titles to their name and has worked closely with numerous corporate sponsors, including HSBC, United Overseas Bank (UOB), Hong Leong Bank, Nippon Paint, Absolut Vodka, Bombay Sapphire, Glenmorangie, Furla, Royal Selangor and Siemens, who have supported them in several projects since its inception.

The gallery
The gallery focuses on contemporary art, with a specific focus on Malaysian art and culture. Running on different programs and exhibitions each month, works are made by some of Malaysia's contemporary artists. The gallery also represents foreign artists such as Cuban artist Nelson Dominguez, the Pakistani sculptor Amin Gulgee, and most recently hosted Rome-based conceptual artist H.H. Lim’s first solo exhibition in Malaysia. Over the last twelve years, Wei-Ling Gallery has held more than 95 exhibitions at its galleries in Malaysia and at exhibition spaces abroad.

International recognition
Since 2006, Wei-Ling Gallery has embarked on a bolder approach in bringing Malaysian contemporary art to an international platform and have since taken exhibitions to Pakistan, India, China, Hong Kong, Taiwan, and Singapore. They also regularly participate in international art fairs such as Art Taipei, CIGE(Beijing), KIAF (Korean International Art Fair), Art Stage Singapore and Art Basel Hong Kong

Artist residency
In 2014, Wei-Ling Gallery, in collaboration with WOLO Bukit Bintang Hotel, launched its first fully funded artist residency in the Bukit Bintang area of Kuala Lumpur, Malaysia. The residency hopes to introduce foreign artists to Kuala Lumpur and Malaysian culture, to eventually realize a project that draws upon the identity of Malaysia.

The space
Located in a pre-war building in the distinctive suburb of Brickfields, this area is known to be one of the oldest settlements of Kuala Lumpur and is home to many residences, commercial entities and religious structures of different denominations. The building, known to be a historical and architectural landmark, was razed in a fire in 2004, but was re-constructed by local award-winning architect, Jimmy Lim, to house both Jimmy Lim Design (JLD) and the gallery. The refurbishment of the building garnered an architectural award for its innovation in adaptive re-use.

Expansion
In 2011, the gallery launched Wei-Ling Contemporary, their second space in Kuala Lumpur at The Gardens Mall, and in 2013, their third gallery space at the prestigious Eastern & Oriental Hotel (E&O Hotel) in Penang.

References

External links
 Wei-Ling Gallery
 WOLO Artist Residency

2002 establishments in Malaysia
Art museums and galleries in Kuala Lumpur